The Canton of Pleumartin is a former canton situated in the Vienne département of France. It was disbanded following the French canton reorganisation which came into effect in March 2015. It had a total of 6,744 inhabitants (2012, without double counting).

Composition 
The Canton of Pleumartin comprised 9 communes:

Chenevelles
Coussay-les-Bois
Leigné-les-Bois
Lésigny
Mairé
Pleumartin
La Puye
La Roche-Posay
Vicq-sur-Gartempe

Demography

See also

Arrondissement of Châtellerault
Cantons of the Vienne department
Communes of the Vienne department

References

Former cantons of Vienne
2015 disestablishments in France
States and territories disestablished in 2015